Bolangir is a constituency of the Vidhan Sabha in Odisha, India. This seats falls under Bolangir District of Odisha State in India. Bolangir seat is a unreserved seat of Odisha Legislative Assembly. This constituency includes Balangir block and Deogaon block.

Elected Members

Sixteen elections were held between 1951 and 2019.
Elected members from the Bolangir constituency are:

Election Results

In 2014 election, Indian National Congress candidate Narasingha Mishra defeated Biju Janata Dal candidate Ananga Udaya Singh Deo by a margin of 12,254 votes.

In 2009 election, Biju Janata Dal candidate Ananga Udaya Singh Deo defeated Congress candidate Laxman Kumar Meher by a margin of 16,866 votes.

Notes

References

Balangir
Assembly constituencies of Odisha
Balangir district